Shadows of Paris (French: Brumes de Paris) is a 1932 French film directed by Maurice Sollin.

Cast
 Colette Andris
 Alexej Bondireff
 Dolly Davis 
 Kissa Kouprine 
 Jean-François Martial 
 Max Maxudian 
 Theo Shall

References

Bibliography 
 Crisp, Colin. Genre, Myth and Convention in the French Cinema, 1929-1939. Indiana University Press, 2002.

External links 
 

1932 films
1930s French-language films
French black-and-white films
1930s French films